The 2016–17 Biathlon World Cup – World Cup 6 was held in Antholz, Italy, from 19 January until 22 January 2017.

Schedule of events

Medal winners

Men

Women

References 

2016-17 Biathlon World Cup - World Cup 6
2017 in Italian sport
January 2017 sports events in Italy
2016-17 Biathlon World Cup - World Cup 6